Kumar Suman Singh is an Indian politician who represents Hilsa Assembly constituency from Lok Janshakti Party.

See also
Politics of India

References

1976 births
Living people
21st-century Indian politicians
Place of birth missing (living people)
Lok Janshakti Party politicians